Strašnice tram depot is a tram and trolleybus depot in Strašnice that has been part of the Prague tram network since 1908. The depot was the biggest along with Žižkov tram depot. It was completely reconstructed in the 1920s and 1930s.

References

Rail transport in Prague
Buildings and structures in Prague
Railway stations opened in 1908
Tram depots
1908 establishments in Austria-Hungary
20th-century establishments in Bohemia